South Dorset Giants was a rugby league team based in Weymouth, Dorset. They played in the South West Division of the Rugby League Conference.
In 2017, a new club Dorset County Giants Rugby League was formed with players from South Dorset Giants forming a new team to play in the SW Rugby League.

History
South Dorset Giants was founded in 2008 at Weymouth RFC's Monmouth Avenue ground. The Giants played four friendly games in their inaugural season with a 50% success rate and joined the South West division of the Rugby League Conference in 2009.
Dorset County Giants Rugby League was founded in 2017 as a new side building on the previous Dorset Giants team roots.

External links
 Official site

Rugby League Conference teams
Rugby league teams in Dorset
Rugby clubs established in 2008
Rugby clubs established in 2017
2008 establishments in England
English rugby league teams